Kui Buri railway station is a railway station located in Kui Buri Subdistrict, Kui Buri District, Prachuap Khiri Khan.

Services 
 Rapid No. 177/178 Thon Buri-Lang Suan-Thon Buri
 Ordinary 251/252 Bang Sue Junction-Prachuap Khiri Khan-Bang Sue Junction
 Ordinary 254/255 Lang Suan-Thon Buri-Lang Suan

References 
 
 

Railway stations in Thailand
Prachuap Khiri Khan province